General Sir James Freeth  (5 March 1786 – 19 January 1867) was Quartermaster-General to the Forces.

Military career
Freeth was commissioned into the 98th Regiment of Foot in 1806. He served in the Peninsular War and in France from 1809 to 1814 and, in 1851, was appointed Quartermaster-General to the Forces. He went on to be Colonel of the 64th Regiment of Foot in 1855.

He was promoted Lieutenant-General in 1858 and full General in 1865.

Family
He married Harriett Holt and together they went on to have six sons and two daughters. Three of his sons became major-generals; his great-grandchild, Francis Arthur Freeth, was a chemist who developed a number of processes in explosives manufacture and a major in the Territorial Army.

References

External links

 

|-

1786 births
1867 deaths
British Army generals
North Staffordshire Regiment officers
Knights Commander of the Order of the Bath
Military personnel from Warwickshire
Burials at Brompton Cemetery